Chennamaneni is an Indian surname. Notable people with the surname include:

 Chennamaneni Hanumantha Rao (born 1929), Indian economist
 Chennamaneni Rajeshwara Rao (1923–2016), Indian politician
 Chennamaneni Vidyasagar Rao (born 1941), Indian politician
 Chennamaneni Ramesh (born 1956), Indian politician

Indian surnames